Luswisi is an administrative ward in Ileje District, Mbeya Region, Tanzania. According to the 2002 census, the ward has a total population of 4,790.

References

Wards of Songwe Region